The 2000 du Maurier Open women's singles was the singles event of the ninety-ninth women's edition of the Canadian Open; a WTA Tier I tournament and the most prestigious women's tennis tournament held in Canada. Martina Hingis was the defending champion, and won in the final 0–6, 6–3, 3–0, after Serena Williams retired due to a left foot injury.

Seeds
The top eight seeds received a bye into the second round. 

  Martina Hingis (champion)
  Lindsay Davenport (third round, retired due to a left ankle injury)
  Conchita Martínez (semifinals)
  Serena Williams (final, retired due to a left foot injury)
  Nathalie Tauziat (second round)
  Anke Huber (third round)
  Arantxa Sánchez Vicario (semifinals)
  Sandrine Testud (quarterfinals)
  Amanda Coetzer (second round)
  Julie Halard-Decugis (third round, withdrew due to lower back pain)
  Anna Kournikova (third round)
  Dominique Van Roost (first round)
  Jennifer Capriati (third round)
  Barbara Schett (first round)
  Chanda Rubin (third round)
  Amy Frazier (quarterfinals)

Draw

Finals

Top half

Section 1

Section 2

Bottom half

Section 3

Section 4

External links
WTA draw
ITF draw

Women's Singles